Henry Andrew Imshaug (1925–2010) was an American lichenologist notable for work on the genus Buellia and his "enormous and important collections from the Rocky Mountains, Great Lakes region, West Indies and subantarctic islands, together with his studies of those collections". He is also known for mentoring numerous notable lichenologists and bryologists. He was a professor at Michigan State University. Imshaug is honoured in the lichen genus name Imshaugia.

See also
 :Category:Taxa named by Henry Andrew Imshaug

References

American lichenologists
1925 births
2010 deaths
Michigan State University alumni